In enzymology, a glycolate dehydrogenase is an enzyme that catalyzes the chemical reaction

glycolate + acceptor  glyoxylate + reduced acceptor

Thus, the two substrates of this enzyme are glycolate and acceptor, whereas its two products are glyoxylate and reduced acceptor.

This enzyme belongs to the family of oxidoreductases, specifically those acting on the CH-OH group of donor with other acceptors. The systematic name of this enzyme class is glycolate:acceptor 2-oxidoreductase. Other names in common use include glycolate oxidoreductase, glycolic acid dehydrogenase, and glycolate:(acceptor) 2-oxidoreductase. This enzyme participates in glyoxylate and dicarboxylate metabolism.

References 

 

EC 1.1.99
Enzymes of unknown structure